Morton Plains is a town in the local government area of the Shire of Buloke, Victoria, Australia. The post office there opened on 1 August 1864 and was closed on 9 May 1931.

References